United Communications Corporation (UCC) was a privately owned operator of three television stations in the U.S. states of Minnesota and New York. The company was the publisher of the Kenosha News of Kenosha, Wisconsin and two other daily newspapers.

History 
Founded in 1961 by the Brown family, upon its purchase of the News, the company added a Massachusetts newspaper in the 1970s, buying two competing newspapers—the Attleboro Sun and North Attleborough Chronicle—and merging them into The Sun Chronicle.

UCC then entered the television business through two sales mandated by Federal Communications Commission (FCC) competition rules. The Watertown Daily Times of Watertown, New York, 
sold WWNY-TV for $8.2 million in 1981; the national media chain Lee Enterprises sold KEYC-TV in Mankato, Minnesota, in 1977.

In the 21st century, UCC added its last two properties, founding WNYF-LP, a low-power television station in Watertown, New York, in 2001, and a year later buying the Watertown Public Opinion in eastern South Dakota.

Owner and President Howard J. Brown died April 29, 2011.

In March 2013, his daughter Lucy Brown Minn was named president of the company. Her mother, Elizabeth K. Brown, serves as chairwoman of the board.

Former properties

Newspapers 
 Kenosha News of Kenosha, Wisconsin, acquired 1961, sold 2019.
The Sun Chronicle of Attleboro, Massachusetts, acquired 1970, sold 2018.
Watertown Public Opinion of Watertown, South Dakota, acquired 2002, sold 2016.

Television 
 KEYC-TV, a CBS (DT1) and Fox (DT2) affiliate, of Mankato, Minnesota, acquired 1977, sold in 2019.
 WWNY-TV, a CBS affiliate, of Watertown, New York, acquired 1981, sold in 2019.
 WNYF-CD, a Fox affiliate, of Watertown, New York, founded 2001, sold in 2019.

References 

United Communications Corporation
Gray Television
Defunct television broadcasting companies of the United States
Defunct newspaper companies of the United States
Mass media companies established in 1961
Mass media companies disestablished in 2019
Companies based in Wisconsin
Privately held companies based in Wisconsin
Publishing companies established in 1961
2019 mergers and acquisitions
Kenosha, Wisconsin
American companies disestablished in 2019
American companies established in 1961